Jason Ellis may refer to:

 Jason Ellis (radio host) (born 1971), Australian radio host and retired skateboarder
 Jason Ellis (basketball) (born 1982), American basketball player